The 2015 Richmond Spiders football team represented the University of Richmond in the 2015 NCAA Division I FCS football season. They were led by fourth-year head coach Danny Rocco and played their home games at E. Claiborne Robins Stadium. The Spiders were a member of the Colonial Athletic Association (CAA). The Spiders finished as a CAA co-champion along with James Madison and William & Mary, who all finished with identical 6–2 conference records. The Spiders received the CAA's automatic bid to the FCS playoffs by virtue of a head-to-head tiebreaker, having defeated both James Madison and William & Mary during the regular season. After receiving a first-round bye and defeating William & Mary in the second round and Illinois State in the quarterfinals, the Spiders lost to North Dakota State in the semifinals, 33–7.

Schedule

Source: Schedule

Game summaries

at Maryland

at Hampton

VMI

Maine

Elon

at Rhode Island

at James Madison

Albany

at New Hampshire

at Villanova

William & Mary

FCS Playoffs

Second Round – William & Mary

Quarterfinals – Illinois State

Semifinals – North Dakota State

Ranking movements

References

Richmond
Richmond Spiders football seasons
Colonial Athletic Association football champion seasons
Richmond
Richmond Spiders football